Remembering may refer to:

 Recall (memory), the retrieval of events or information from the past
 Remembering (Grant Green album), 1961
 Remembering – Part 1, a compilation album by rock group Thin Lizzy